Amoashtart was a queen of Sidon in the period. When ca. 539 her husband and brother, king Tabnit, died, she had an infant son, Eshmunazar II, or, more probably, was pregnant of him. The next fourteen years she was co-regent with her young son, until the boy died, "in his fourteenth year", ca. 525. She then was succeeded by her nephew Bodashtart, possibly in a palace coup. Modern historians have characterized her as an "energetic, responsible [woman], and endowed with immense political acumen, [who] exercised royal functions for many years".

The only source for her biography is the sarcophagus of her son Eshmunazar II.

Etymology 
Amoashtart is the Latinized form of the Phoenician theophoric name 𐤀𐤌𐤏𐤔𐤕𐤓𐤕 meaning "my mother is Astarte".Variable spellings include: Em-Astarte, Amo-Astarte,’Am‘aštart, and Immi-Ashtart.

Biography
Amoashtart became queen ca. 550 BCE as the wife of king Tabnit. This was a period when the economy of Sidon thrived, possibly after the competing city of Tyre had been hit severely by an earthquake (c. 550). Sidon was "reborn as an independent kingdom" and became "the leading Phoenician polity". The economic boom made possible an extensive building program of new city districts and grandiose temples for Ashtart, Baal, and Eshmun, as is testified in the inscriptions of both Eshmunazar II and Bodashtart. Because of the age of her boy son, these activities will in practice have been the initiative of the mother. A sign of the preeminent role of Sidon in Phoenicia is that the Persian kings (the "Lord of Kings") endowed Sidon with the rule over the two southern Palestinian cities of Dor and Jaffa, and the "land of Dagon", possibly as a means to strengthen Sidonian loyalty to the Achaemenid rule.

As the Eshmunazar II sarcophagus tells us, Amoastart was also a high priestess of Astarte. This traditionally was the main task of Sidonian kings.

Amoashtart's successor, her nephew Bodashtart, in his inscriptions makes no mention of her. However, the way in which he expressly emphasizes that he is a "just successor", is somewhat suspicious. It suggests that the old lady, 25 years a queen, may not have voluntarily given up power after the death of her son. 

An Amoashtart sarcophagus has never been found. It is thought that one of the nameless sarcophagi in the royal tomb of Sidon may be hers.

Egyptian influences
Amoashtart was married to her own brother, Tabnit. This was common practice among the Egyptian pharaohs, and it may be a sign of strong Egyptian cultural influence in Phoenicia at the time. Since the ninth century Phoenicia had nominally been part of at first the Assyrian, then the Babylonian, and then the Persian empires, but in the early sixth century, between ca. 610 and c. 570, Egypt had repeatedly invaded Phoenicia, and economic contacts between Egypt and Phoenicia traditionally were strong. Admiration for Egyptian culture is also visible from the use of Egyptian or Egyptian style sarcophagi by the Sidonian rulers Tabnit and Eshmunazar II.

Genealogy 
Amoashtart is the daughter of Eshmunazar I, the founder of his namesake dynasty.

References

Citations

Sources 

6th-century BC rulers in Asia
Kings of Sidon
Rulers in the Achaemenid Empire
6th-century BC Phoenician people